Two People is a 1924 German silent drama film directed by Hanns Schwarz and starring Olaf Fjord and Ágnes Esterházy. It was based on the 1911 novel of the same title by Richard Voss. Subsequent films versions were made in 1930 and 1952.

Cast

References

Bibliography

External links

1924 films
Films of the Weimar Republic
German silent feature films
Films directed by Hanns Schwarz
Films based on German novels
Films about Catholic priests
Films set in the Alps
German black-and-white films
German drama films
1924 drama films
Silent drama films
1920s German films
1920s German-language films